This is a list of rivers of Trinidad and Tobago.

Trinidad
Caroni River
Lalland River
Oropouche River
Salybia River
Mathura River
Maracas River
Shark River
Caura River
Valencia River
Caparo River
Marchine River (Affluentto the Lalland River) 
Hondo River
Maraval River
Blue Basin River
Diego Martin River 
San Juan River
St. Joseph River
Covigne River Gorge
Marianne River
Shark River
Yarra River
Chaguaramas River
Moruga River
Maturita River
Pilote River
Jack River
Santa Cruz River
Tunapuna River
Macoya/Trantrill River
Tacarigua River (Caura River)
Arouca River
Oropuna River
Mausica River
Arima River
Talparo River
Tumpuna River
Guanapo River
El Mamo River
Aripo River
Cumuto River
Guayamare River
Couva River
Guaracara River
Tarouba River
Cipero River
Guapo River
Cunupia River
Ravine Sable River

Tobago

 Courland River
 Coffee River
 Castara River
 Bloody Bay River

 Cook River (Tobago)
 Bacolet River
 Sandy River
 Hillsborough West River
 Hillsborough East River
 Goldsborough River
 Richmond River (Great Dog River)
 Belle River
 Roxborough River
 Queens River
 Kings Bay River

References

, GEOnet Names Server
Trinidad tourist map
Tobago tourist map
Trinidad and Tobago Water Resources

Trinidad and Tobago
Rivers
Trin